Porphyrosela gautengi is a moth of the family Gracillariidae. It is found in South Africa in secondary forests.

The length of the forewings is 1.9–2.07 mm. The forewing ground colour is golden ochreous. The hindwings are light fuscous with a slight ochreous shade. Adults are on wing from late November to mid-April.

The larvae feed as leaf miners on Vigna luteola. The mine is found on the upperside of the leaf.

Etymology
The specific epithet is derived from the name of the South African province Gauteng, where the type locality is located.

References

Endemic moths of South Africa
Moths described in 2012
Lithocolletinae
Moths of Africa

Leaf miners
Taxa named by Jurate de Prins
Lepidoptera of South Africa